Mount Hale is a mountain located in Grafton County, New Hampshire. The mountain is named after Reverend Edward Everett Hale (1822–1909), and is part of the Twin Range of the White Mountains.  The western and eastern sides of  Mount Hale are drained by the Little River and Zealand River respectively, and thence into the Ammonoosuc River, Connecticut River, and into Long Island Sound in Connecticut.

See also

 List of mountains in New Hampshire
 White Mountain National Forest

References

External links
 "Mount Hale". Appalachian Mountain Club.
 
 "Mt. Hale Hiking Guide". FranklinSites.com.

Mountains of New Hampshire
Mountains of Grafton County, New Hampshire
New England Four-thousand footers